Seven: The Street Prequel is the first mix tape by the Italian rapper Bassi Maestro, released in 2004 under Sano Business.

Track listing

External links 

2004 mixtape albums
Bassi Maestro albums